The 2019–20 Northwestern Wildcats women's basketball team represented Northwestern University during the 2019–20 NCAA Division I women's basketball season as members of the Big Ten Conference. The Wildcats were led by head coach Joe McKeown, in his 12th year coaching the team. They returned to play their home games at Welsh–Ryan Arena after a renovation relocated them the prior season.

Roster

Schedule and results

|-
!colspan=9 style=| Exhibition

|-
!colspan=9 style=| Non-conference regular season

|-
!colspan=9 style=| Big Ten regular season

|-
!colspan=9 style= |Big Ten Women's Tournament

Rankings

See also
2019–20 Northwestern Wildcats men's basketball team

References

Northwestern Wildcats women's basketball seasons
Northwestern
Northwestern Wild
Northwestern Wild